Portrait of Lavinia Vecellio is a c.1545 portrait by Tiziano Vecellio (Titian) of his daughter Lavinia. This oil on wood painting is held in the Museo di Capodimonte, Naples. 

Vecellio, Lavinia
Vecellio, Lavinia
1545 paintings
Paintings in the collection of the Museo di Capodimonte
Portraits of women